Kiri Aluwa, also known as milk toffee or kiri toffee, is a popular traditional Sri Lankan soft toffee.

These soft caramelised milk confectionery come in the shape of little squares, whose size varies according to tradition. The principal ingredients are sweetened condensed milk, sugar and butter, they are often flavored with a variety of spices including cinnamon, cardamom or sea salt. Other variations include the addition of cashews and rasins. 

It is similar to the Scottish sugary confection, tablet, which was first identified in the early 18th century. Other close dishes include the Québécois Sucre à la crème, the South American tableta de leche and the Dutch borstplaat. It is likely that the dish evolved from bonda aluwa, a combination of coconut, rice flour and jaggery - which was combined and rolled into a sausage shape and wrapped in plantain leaves.

See also 
 Fudge
 Kalakand
 Sucre à la crème
 Tablet
 Toffee

References 

Sri Lankan desserts and sweets
Sinhalese New Year foods
Milk dishes